The 14th Waffen Grenadier Division of the SS (1st Galician), known as the 14th SS-Volunteer Division "Galicia" prior to 1944, was a World War II German military formation made up predominantly of military volunteers with a Ukrainian ethnic background from the area of Galicia, later also with some Slovaks. Formed in 1943, it was largely destroyed in the battle of Brody, reformed, and saw action in Slovakia, Yugoslavia, and Austria before being renamed the first division of the Ukrainian National Army and surrendering to the Western Allies by 10 May 1945.

Background 
After World War I and the dissolution of Austria-Hungary, the territory of Eastern Galicia (Halychyna), populated by a Ukrainian majority but with a large Polish minority, was incorporated into Poland following the Polish–Ukrainian War. Between the wars, the political allegiances of Ukrainians in eastern Galicia were divided between moderate national democrats and the more radical Organization of Ukrainian Nationalists. The latter group itself splintered into two factions, the more moderate OUN-M led by Andriy Melnyk with close ties to German intelligence (Abwehr), and the more radical OUN-B led by Stepan Bandera. When Poland was divided between Germany and the Soviet Union under the terms of the Molotov–Ribbentrop Pact in 1939, the territory of eastern Galicia was annexed to Soviet Ukraine. In 1941 it was occupied by Germany.

Ukrainian leaders of various political persuasions recognised the need for a trained armed force. The Germans had earlier considered the formation of an armed force made up of Slavic people, but they decided this to be unacceptable as they regarded Slavs as sub-humans (untermenschen) compared to the Germanic Übermenschen master race. At the beginning of 1943, growing losses inclined Nazi leaders to alter their initial opinions.

Organization 

The idea to organize a division of volunteers from Galicia was proposed by the German governor of District Galicia, Otto Wächter. He suggested creation of a Waffen-SS division composed of Galician volunteers and designed for regular combat on the Eastern Front. The creation of 14th Voluntary Division SS Galizien was announced in April 1943 at ceremonies throughout Galicia. At least 50 documents including contemporary newspaper clippings, radio broadcasts and speeches etc. record the date of 28 April. By June 1943 the first phase of recruitment had taken place. Initially Wächter's proposal (which he was certain would be supported by Ukrainian circles) was rejected. In Berlin Wächter was able to get support from Heinrich Himmler who made the stipulation that the division would only made up of Galicians, who Himmler considered "more Aryan-like". The terms "Ukrainian", "Ukraine", could not be used when addressing the division, stressing the Imperial Austro-Hungarian heritage of the term "Galizien". David Marples suggests that the division was titled "Galicia" to avoid using the politically contentious term "Ukrainian," while historian Samuel W. Mitcham Jr. claims the term was chosen at the insistence of Hitler, which irritated many of the Slavic recruits."

Wächter approached the Ukrainian Central Committee, a nonpolitical social welfare organization headed by Volodymyr Kubiyovych which supported the idea of the formation of the division. The Ukrainian Greek Catholic Church demanded the presence of its chaplains in the division, which was usually not permitted by the SS. Thus the Ukrainian division along with the Bosnian one became notable exceptions.

Germans made three political concessions: It was stipulated that the division shall not be used to fight Western Allies, and would be used exclusively to "fight Bolsheviks". The other concession was in that its oath of allegiance to Hitler was conditional on the fight against Bolshevism and in the fact that Christian (mostly Ukrainian Greek Catholic Church and Ukrainian Autocephalous Orthodox Church) chaplains were integrated into the units and allowed to function (in the 

Waffen-SS, only the Bosnian division and Sturmbrigade Wallonien had a clerical presence). The latter condition was instituted at the insistence of the division's organizers in order to minimize the risk of Nazi demoralization amongst the soldiers. Indeed, Nazi indoctrination was absent within the division.

The creation of foreign SS units had been carried out previously in the name of fighting against communism; with French, Flemish, Walloon, Dutch, Latvian, Estonian, Croatian, and Belarusian units, among others, had been created. The creation of a Ukrainian SS division was perceived by many in Ukraine as a step towards the attainment of Ukrainian independence and attracted many volunteers.

Support 

The division enjoyed support from multiple political and religious groups within the western Ukrainian community. The division's prime organizer and highest ranking Ukrainian officer, Dmytro Paliiv, who although he was an SS-Freiw. Haupsturmfuhrer was actually higher in rank than Yevhen Pobihushchyi, the division's commander, who held a higher rank of SS-Freiw. Sturmbannführer had been the leader of a small legal political party in the Second Polish Republic. Many of his colleagues had been members of the pre-war moderate, left-leaning democratic UNDO movement that before the war had also been opposed to the authoritarian OUN. The division also obtained moral support from officers of the exiled Polish-allied Ukrainian People's Republic such as General Mykhailo Omelianovych-Pavlenko. The division was also strongly supported by Andriy Melnyk's moderate faction of the OUN, who saw it as a counterweight to the extremist Banderite-dominated UPA.

The Bandera faction of the OUN-B opposed the idea of creating the division, in part because it was an organization outside its control, and had claimed in its propaganda that the division was to be used by the Germans as cannon fodder.   Nevertheless, it did not interfere in its formation and once the division was formed it sent some of its members, a number of whom would obtain prominent positions, into the division in order for them to gain military training and to prevent it from completely getting out of their hands. Despite this infiltration, Bandera's OUN failed to gain control over the division. It also had the support of both the Ukrainian Greek Catholic Church and the Ukrainian Autocephalous Orthodox Church. Among its members was a son of Mstyslav Skrypnyk, the Orthodox Bishop of Kyiv.

Commanders and personnel 

The Division SS "Galizien" was commanded by German, Austrian and Ukrainian officers. Training for the recruits began within the SS-Special Purpose Training Battalion (SS-Ausbildungs-Battalion z.b.V), commanded by SS Sturmbannführer Bernard Bartlet while the man appointed to oversee the forming of the division was General Walter Schimana (until October 1943). Schimana never commanded the actual division, as up until the point of his departure it was still a training battalion, staffed mostly by temporary training personnel. According to his SS officer file from 20 October 1944 and NOT From 20 November 1943 it was led by SS-Brigadier General Fritz Freitag. Captain Wolf Dietrich Heike (temporarily seconded from the Wehrmacht) was the chief of staff from January 1944. Among the staff of the division Yevhen Pobihushchyi, a Ukrainian Wehrmacht officer who had been arrested following the dissolution of Schutzmannschaft Battalion 201 and previously commanded both Schutzmannschaft Battalion 201 and the Roland Battalion.

In total an estimated c. 53,000 men enlisted for service in the division. Of these, 42,000 were called up during the first 'recruitment phase' which took place in May and June 1943 from which only 27,000 were deemed fit for military service and 13,000 were enlisted. To boost the recruitment figures the height minimum requirement was lowered from 1.65m to 1.61m.

The most highly decorated officer of the division was Captain Volodymyr Kozak.

Deployment

Anti-partisans actions with Kampfgruppe Beyersdorff 
In mid-February 1944, the division received an order to form a battle group known as SS Kampfgruppe Beyersdorff for action against Soviet and Polish partisans. It operated in the Zamość area together with elements of the 5th Regiment, while elements of the 4th Regiment were sent to the Brody area. The SS Kampfgruppe performed its duty well enough that it earned the rare praise of German Field Marshal Walter Model.

Brody 
In July the division was sent to the area of Brody, where heavy combat was under way, and was attached to the 13th Army Corps. On 8 July, the 13th Corps was transferred to the 1st Panzer Army. The Galician Division was placed in reserve. Deployed at Brody were the division's 29th, 30th, 31st regiments, a fusilier and engineering battalion, and its artillery regiment. The 14th SS Field Replacement Battalion was deployed  behind the other units.

On 13 July, Soviet forces under the command of Marshal Ivan Konev launched their attack. By the next day, they routed a German division to the north of the 13th Corps and swept back an attempted German counterattack.  On 15 July, the 1st and 8th Panzer Divisions along with a single regiment from the Galicia Division (WGR 30) were deployed in a counterattack against the Soviet penetration in the Koltiv area by the Soviet Second Air Army, who in only a five-hour period flew 3,288 aircraft sorties and dropped 102 tons of bombs on them as they attempted a counterattack. On 18 July, the division's Field Replacement Battalion largely escaped the encirclement so that 11 officers 54 NCOs and 954 were reported by the battalion commander as having escaped on 21 July 1944 and fled west, whilst the remainder of 13th Corps, consisting of over 30,000 German and Ukrainian soldiers, was surrounded by the Soviets within the Brody pocket.

Within the pocket, the Galician troops were tasked with defending the eastern perimeter near the castle and town of Pidhirtsy and Olesko. The Soviets sought to collapse the Brody pocket by focusing their attack of what they perceived to be its weakest point, this was not the relatively inexperienced Galician Division, it was in fact the 349 Infantry division which its own War Diary and the War Diary of 4 Panzer Army reveal unequivocally suffered devastating losses in the initial Soviet offensive which is why the 14 Galician Division was committed piece-meal to reinforce the 349 I.D's sector of the front. The 29th and 30th regiments of the division, supported by the division's artillery regiment, put up unexpectedly fierce resistance. Pidhirtsy changed hands several times before the Galicians were finally overwhelmed by the late afternoon, and at Olesko a major Soviet attack using T-34 tanks was repulsed by the division's Fusilier and Engineer battalions.

On 20 July, the German divisions within the pocket attempted a breakout which failed partly because the rain in the previous day had made the roads impassable for the armour of III Panzer Corps which was striking north to relieve the entrapped forces despite early successes. By this point the Division's 30 and 31st regiments were destroyed in fighting. A second German breakout attempt that began at 1:00 am on 21 July ended in failure.  to the west of the pocket, however, a German Panzergrenadier regiment actually called the '8 Panzer Division' broke through Soviet lines and briefly established contact with the Brody pocket, resulting in a message sent at 19.07 hrs on 21 July from XXXXVIII.Pz.Kps to 1 Panzer Army reporting "5,000 men from XIII.AK. having been rescued" – followed by a second message sent on 23 July reporting 8–10,000 men and finally on 26 July 8. Panzer Division reported it had "picked up approximately 15,000 soldiers", including approximately 400 Galicians, before being repulsed. By the end of that day, in the face of overwhelming Soviet attacks, the 14th Division as a whole disintegrated. Late on 19 July its German commander, Fritz Freitag, resigned his command and was called in for service with XIII.A.K. staff. Command of the division was then given to General Lindemann the commander of the 361.Inf.div. Freitag remained with the Corps staff and did not form a battle group and head south Some Ukrainian assault groups remained intact, others joined German units, and others fled or melted away. The Ukrainian 14th SS Fusilier battalion, which at this point had also largely disintegrated, came to form the rearguard of what was left of the entire 13th Corps. Holding the town of Bilyi Kamin, it enabled units or stragglers to escape to the south and was able to withstand several Soviet attempts to overwhelm it. By the evening of 21 July, it remained the only intact unit north of the Bug River even though several of its former members for example Mykola Fylypovych recorded that 'by 19 July there was chaos in the fusilier battalion no command, no orders, no ammunition'.

In the early morning of 22 July, the 14th Fusilier battalion abandoned Bilye Kamin. The German and Galician soldiers were instructed to attack with everything they had by moving forward until they broke through or were destroyed. Fighting was fierce and desperate. The German and Ukrainian soldiers surging south were able to overwhelm the Soviet  and its infantry support, and to escape by the thousands. The remaining pocket collapsed by the evening of 22 July.

Despite the severity of the fighting, the division disintegrated having sustained enormous losses and having lost one regimental commander killed (Paul Herms Kdr WGR 31) and one wounded (Friedrich Dern kdr WHR 29) on 19 July causing Freitag to resign his command. Of the approximately 11,000 Galician soldiers deployed at Brody, about 3,000 were able to almost immediately re-enter the division. Approx 7,400 were posted as "Missing in combat".

It has been mistakenly suggested  that the losses for the 14th SS Division in Brody, which ran at 73%, were higher than the rest of the Corps. The other battle-hardened German units which had formed XIII.A.K. produced similar casualty reports. About 5,000 men of Korpsabteilung 'C' which formed the spearhead of the breakout forces escaped the encirclement with sidearms but without vehicles, horses, and other weapons, supplies, and equipment. A total of 73 officers and 4,059 NCOs and men were listed as killed or missing. By comparison, the 361st Infantry Division which deployed fewer troops at the beginning of the battle than the Galician Division and together with it formed the rearguard, suffered equal losses. Between 16 and 22 July, it sustained almost as many casualties with total losses amounting to 6,310 officers and men (dead, missing or wounded). The necessary manpower required to rebuild this and the other German formations was not available and they were subsequently disbanded and the survivors incorporated into other divisions. Although 73% of its personnel did not return to the division, the most recent research suggests that upward of 2,000 Ukrainian men survived but chose to join the Ukrainian partisans. Others deserted and returned to civilian whilst a relatively small number joined other units and remained with them until the end of the war. Some were also taken prisoner. On this basis the number of Ukrainians who were neither killed nor taken prisoner was in actuality closer to 6,000 men – meaning its actual loss ratio was not as high as any of the German units involved whose personnel were either killed, or captured.

As for XIII.A.K., the final report of the Corps's liquidation commission (applicable to its regular army units only) recorded 21,766 killed or missing in action, which together with the 7,000 killed or missing men from the Galician Division brings to the total lost to about 29,000. This figure corresponds with General Lange's own estimate of a total of 25–30,000 killed in the encirclement. On the other hand, the recently declassified secret Soviet General Staff report states that during the course of the battle their forces destroyed more than 30,000 soldiers and officers, 85 tanks and self-propelled guns, over 500 guns of various calibres, 476 mortars, 705 machine guns, 12,000 rifles and submachine guns, 5,843 vehicles, 183 tractors and trailers and 2,430 motorcycles and bicycles. It also claims that over 17,000 soldiers and officers were taken prisoner, 28 tanks and self-propelled guns were captured, as were over 500 guns of various calibres, more than 600 mortars, 483 machine guns, 11,000 rifles and sub-machine guns, over 1,500 vehicles, 98 tractors and trailers, 376 motorcycles and bicycles, in excess of 3,000 horses and 28 warehouses full of military goods. Such reports often included grossly inaccurate estimations and were even regarded by Soviet leaders as suspect. An estimated total number of survivors of all XIII.A.K. units has been given by the adjutant of the 349th Infantry Division as 15,000 officers and men, while a slightly lower figure of 12,000 was subsequently given by Oberst Wilck.

The division in Slovakia 
The Germans rebuilt the division over two months using primarily forced conscripts. From the end of September 1944, the division was used against the Slovak National Uprising.

Units of the 14th SS Division Galizien were sent to help quash the Slovakian rebellion. Various divisional battle groups (Kampfgruppen) were formed to actively search out and destroy Slovak partisans.

In the German Federal Archives in Koblenz, there are numerous police and SS intelligence reports which consistently reported serious problems between the Ukrainian SS men and the local Slovak population. According to one such report of December 1944, “In general much is currently being said amongst the Slovak population about the Ukrainian soldiers now stationed in Slovakia. It can be taken from these discussions that these soldiers in general are not much liked. In Slovak circles, hostile to Germany, they are considered mercenaries, who are not fighting for the ideals of a new Europe, rather simply for personal enrichment through robbery and plunder. Even circles friendly to Germany complain passionately about this formation”.

Another Germans Sicherheitdienst report said, “The Slovaks in general complain about the Ukrainians, that they are a bunch of crooks who are responsible for numerous misdeeds. According to reports from many Slovaks, we have learned that the Ukrainians complain about the Bolsheviks and always say that they are much more trouble than the Germans. Some of the Ukrainians, according to the Slovak statements, are particularly unreliable and it's said that they are even doing deals with the Partisans. Slovak circles, particularly among farmers have reacted with great relief to the news that all of the Ukrainian military forces will be withdrawn from Slovakia and replaced with Hungarian soldiers. The population in the countryside would be very pleased, as they say, that the Hungarians are much more reasonable, that is more humane than the Ukrainians.”

There is plenty of evidence of considerable problems with the divisions ill discipline and misconduct from other sources. The divisional commander even requested powers to shoot Ukrainian SS members without trial because he considered their conduct to be so bad in particular they had a tendency to desert and actively assist the Slovak partisans.

Dr. Jan Korcek, the Slovak Military Historical Institute in Bratislava's special authority on Nazi forces active during the Slovak National Uprising, details nine separate incidents where Slovak researchers held the 14th SS Division Galizien responsible for crimes against the Slovak population.

The Slovak State Archives in Bratislava also has lots of useful background material that prove the war crimes of the SS Galicia in Slovakia. The Museum of the Slovak National Uprising in Banska Bystrica contains further proof of these events.

Members of the Ukrainian SS division, particularly those of the Kampfgruppe Wittenmayer of the Galician Division, were certainly involved in killings and reprisals against the civilian population. The Wittenmayer unit was involved in an attack on the village of Smrecany, burning down the village as a reprisal for allegedly helping the partisans.

There was an attack by the same unit on the village of Nizna Boca, where the Ukrainian SS men stormed into the pub, interrogated the men folk and then executed 5 villagers as alleged partisans. One of them, Cyril Zahradnik, was just 15 years old and died calling out for his mummy. He was arrested for having a Russian coin in his pocket and shot in the spot. Of course, no one was allowed to be a partisan until they reached the age of 18. The men responsible were SS troops along with Hlinka Guardists that is to say Slovaks who served with the Germans although the report does not identify anyone by name even though some of the Hlinka Guards were local men. The Kampfgruppe Wittenmayer was an SS unit of the 14th SS Division and wore SS uniforms. 

More evidence for the Wittenmayer unit's involvement in the massacre at Nizna Boca is contained in documents now held in the Czech State Archives in Prague. There are extremely detailed German military situation intelligence reports sent daily from Bratislava to the German military command in Prague during the course of the Slovak uprising and its aftermath. These daily reports give exceptional accuracy as to the precise movements of the Wittenmayer unit throughout their anti-partisan campaign and are unequivocal.

The only Nazi unit in Nizna Boca on the day of the massacre was the Wittenmayer unit. On the very day, the civilians were massacred the report stated, “Kampfgruppe Wittenmayer in process of occupying Nizna Boca (10 km S of Krl. Lehota). The road between Rosenberg and Poprad therefore now free of the enemy. The Ukrainian volunteers of the 14 Waffen Grenadier Division of the SS used in the operation fought excellently.” 

There is unequivocal evidence that some units of the Galician Division in Slovakia did commit war crimes during their service for the Nazis and that there were serious problems with their discipline and conduct during their suppression of the Slovak National Uprising. Some of the Galician units were involved in terrible atrocities throughout their existence, in the Brody district, in Poland and in Slovakia. This is why neither the post-war Ukrainian, Polish or Slovak governments all of which were controlled directly by the Soviets ever filed a formal accusation of war crimes against the division or any of its personnel.

Many of the personnel volunteered to serve in Slovakia, hoping to find friends and relatives among a large group of refugees from Galicia that had been admitted to Slovakia shortly before the uprising. The first unit, a battlegroup formed from one battalion of the 29th regiment with auxiliary units, arrived 28 September 1944. Eventually, all divisional units were transferred to Slovakia. From 15 October 1944 they formed two Kampfgruppe, Wittenmayer and Wildner. (Both of approx reinforced battalion strength)The division operated in coordination with a kampfgruppe from the SS Division Horst Wessel, whilst on paper the SS-Sturmbrigade Dirlewanger was subordinated directly to it but its commander ignored all instructions he received and continued to act independently, the Vlasov detachment and other SS and SD formations until 5 February 1945. According to Slovak historian K. Fremal, the division's "members were helping in anti-partisan, repressive, and terrorist actions and committed murders and other excesses" 

The overall degree of criminality was less than that of Einsatzgruppe H or the Slovak collaborationist Hlinka Guard Emergency Divisions. About 200 soldiers deserted from the division while it was in Slovakia; many joined the Slovak partisans who clearly hated them as they had just spent months terrorising them and committing wanton crimes against the local civilians but remarkably still allowed them to join their ranks.

Anti-partisans actions on the Slovenian-Austrian border 
In the end of January 1945, it was moved to Slovenia, where from the end of February until the end of March 1945, it together with other Army, SS and Polizei  formations fought Yugoslav Partisans in the Styria and Carinthia (province) areas near the Austrian-Slovenian border. During this time, the division absorbed the 31 SD Schutzmannschafts Battalion, also known as the Ukrainian Self Defense legion. When on 31 March Soviet forces commenced an attack from Hungary into Austria that ruptured the German front, the division was ordered to advance northward to Gleichenberg in a desperate attempt to halt the Soviet advance.

Graz 
From 1 April until the end of the war, with a strength of 14,000 combat troops and 8,000 soldiers in a Training and Replacement Regiment, the division fought against the Red Army in the region of Graz in Austria
where in early April it seized the castle and village of Gleichenberg from Soviet forces (including elite Soviet airborne troops from the 3rd Guards Airborne Division) during a counterattack and on 15 April repulsed a Soviet counterattack. The division at this time maintained a 13-km front. During one critical situation, Freitag became so alarmed by the developments at the front, that in the presence of the commander of the 1st Cavalry Corps General der Kavallerie Harteneck, he reacted instinctively and announced his abdication as Divisional commander and responsibility for its performance in action – as he had done at Brody. General Harteneck refused Freitag's resignation and ordered him to remain at his post. Due to his performance during the battles surrounding Gleichenberg, Waffen-Obersturmführer Ostap Czuczkewycz was awarded the Iron Cross, 1st class. The division suffered  casualties while in Austria, with an estimated 1,600 killed or wounded.

1st Ukrainian Division UNA 
On 17 March 1945, Ukrainian émigrés established the Ukrainian National Committee to represent the interests of Ukrainians to the Third Reich. Simultaneously, the Ukrainian National Army, commanded by general Pavlo Shandruk, was created. The Galician Division was renamed to 1st Division of the Ukrainian National Army. However, there is no proof to demonstrate that the renaming was done formally and the German Army's High command continued to list it as the Ukrainian 14th SS Grenadier Division in its order of battle. The division surrendered to British and US forces by 10 May 1945.

Rimini 
Most of the Ukrainian soldiers were interned in Rimini, Italy, in the area controlled by the II Polish Corps. The UNA commander Pavlo Shandruk requested a meeting with Polish general Władysław Anders a prewar Polish Army colleague, asking him to protect the army against the deportation to Soviet Union. There is credible evidence that despite Soviet pressure, Anders managed to protect the Ukrainian troops, as former citizens of the Second Republic of Poland. This, together with the intervention of the Vatican prevented its members from being deported to the USSR. Bishop Buchko of the Ukrainian Greek Catholic Church had appealed to Pope Pius XII to intervene on behalf of the division, whom he described as "good Catholics and fervent anti-Communists". Due to Vatican intervention, the British authorities changed the status of the division members from POW to surrendered enemy personnel. 176 soldiers of the division, mainly prewar Polish Army officers followed their commander in joining Władysław Anders's Polish army.

Former soldiers of SS "Galizien" were allowed to immigrate to Canada and the United Kingdom in 1947. The names of about 8,000 men from the division who were admitted to the UK have been stored in the so-called "Rimini List". Despite several requests of various lobby groups, the details of the list have never been publicly released, however the list is available on line and the original
List is available for public inspection at the Schevchenko Archive in Linden Gardens London. In 2003 the anti-terrorist branch of Scotland Yard launched an investigation into people from the list by cross-referencing NHS patient, social security and pensions records; however, the order to release confidential medical records was met with outcry from civil liberties groups.

Atrocities 
Although the Waffen-SS as a whole was declared to be a criminal organization at the Nuremberg Trials, the Galizien Division has not specifically been found guilty of any war crimes by any war tribunal or commission. However, numerous accusations of impropriety have been leveled at the division, and at particular members of the division, from a variety of sources. It is difficult to determine the extent of war criminality among members of the division. If prior service in Nazi police units is a measure of criminality, only a small number were recruited from established police detachments. Among those who had transferred from police detachments, some had been members of a coastal defence unit that had been stationed in France, while others came from two police battalions that had been formed in the spring of 1943, too late to have participated in the murder of Ukraine's Jews. According to Howard Margolian, there is no evidence that these units participated in anti-partisan operations or reprisals prior to their inclusion into the division. However, before their service within the police battalions, a number of recruits are alleged to have been in Ukrainian irregular formations that are alleged to have committed atrocities against Jews and Communists. Nevertheless, in their investigations of the division, both the Canadian government and the Canadian Jewish Congress failed to find hard evidence to support the notion that it was rife with criminal elements.

The division did destroy several Polish communities in western Ukraine during the winter and spring of 1944. Specifically, the 4th and 5th SS Police Regiments have been accused of murdering Polish civilians in the course of anti-guerilla activity. At the time of their actions, those units were not yet under Divisional command, but were under German police command. Yale historian Timothy Snyder noted that the division's role in the Massacres of Poles in Volhynia and Eastern Galicia was limited, because the murders were primarily carried out by the Ukrainian Insurgent Army.

In a speech to the soldiers of the 1st Galician division, Heinrich Himmler  stated:

In June 2013, Associated Press published an article stating that an American, Michael Karkoc, who was alleged to be a former "deputy company commander" in the division, was implicated in war crimes committed before he joined the division in 1945. According to Associated Press, before joining the Division Karkoc had served as a "lieutenant" of the 2nd Company of the German SS Police-led Ukrainian Self Defense Legion (USDL). The USDL was a paramilitary police organization in the Schutzmannschaft. Karkoc was found living in Lauderdale, Minnesota. He had arrived in the United States in 1949 and became a naturalized citizen in 1959.

Huta Pieniacka 

In the winter and spring of 1944, the SS-Galizien participated in the destruction of several Polish villages, including the village of Huta Pieniacka, were about five hundred civilians were murdered. The Polish historian Grzegorz Motyka has stated that the Germans formed several SS police regiments (numbered from 4 to 8) which included "Galizien" in their name. Those police regiments joined the division in Spring 1944. On 23 February 1944, before being incorporated into the division, the 4th and 5th police regiments had participated in anti-guerrilla action at Huta Pieniacka, against Soviet and Polish Armia Krajowa partisans in the village of Huta Pieniacka, which had also served as a shelter for Jews and as a fortified centre for Polish and Soviet guerrillas. Huta Pieniacka was a Polish self-defence outpost, organized by inhabitants of the village and sheltering civilian refugees from Volhynia. On 23 February 1944, two members of a detachment of the division were shot by the self-defense forces. Five days later, a mixed force of Ukrainian police and German soldiers shelled the village before entering it and ordering all the civilians to gather together. In the ensuing massacre, the village of Huta Pienacka was destroyed, and between 500 and 1,000 of the inhabitants were killed. According to Polish accounts, civilians were locked in barns that were set on fire, while those attempting to flee were killed.

Polish witness accounts state that the soldiers were accompanied by Ukrainian nationalists (paramilitary unit under Włodzimierz Czerniawski's command), which included members of the UPA, as well as inhabitants of nearby villages who took property from households.

The NASU Institute of History of Ukraine of the National Academy of Sciences of Ukraine concluded that the 4th and 5th SS Galizien Police regiments did kill the civilians within the village, but added that the grisly reports by eyewitnesses in the Polish accounts were "hard to come up with" and that the likelihood was "difficult to believe".  The institute also noted that, at the time of the massacre, the police regiments were not under 14th division command, but rather under German police command (specifically, under German Sicherheitsdienst and SS command of the General Government). The Polish Institute of National Remembrance stated: "According to the witness' testimonies, and in the light of the collected documentation, there is no doubt that the 4th battalion 'Galizien' of the 14th division of SS committed the crime"

Pidkamin and Palikrowy 

The village of Pidkamin was the site of a monastery where Poles sought shelter from the encroaching front. On 11 March 1944, around 2,000 people, the majority of whom were women and children, were seeking refuge there when the monastery was attacked by the Ukrainian Insurgent Army (unit under Maksym Skorupsky command), allegedly cooperating with an SS-Galizien unit. The next day, 12 March, the monastery was captured and civilians were murdered (at night part of the population managed to escape). From 12 to 16 March, other civilians were also killed in the town of Pidkamin.

Estimates of victims range from 150, by Polish historian Grzegorz Motyka, to 250, according to the researchers of the Institute of History of the Ukrainian Academy of Sciences.

Members of another SS-Galizien sub-unit also participated in the execution of Polish civilians in Palykorovy, located in the Lwów area (Lviv oblast) near Pidkamin (former Tarnopol Voivodeship). It is estimated that 365 ethnic Poles were murdered, including women and children.

The Canadian Deschênes Commission 

The Canadian "Commission of Inquiry on War Crimes" of October 1986, by the Honourable Justice Jules Deschênes concluded that in relation to membership in the Galicia Division:

The  commission considered the International Military Tribunal's verdict at the Nuremberg Trials, at which the entire Waffen-SS organisation was declared a "criminal organization" guilty of war crimes. Also, in its conclusion, the Deschênes Commission only referred to the division as 14. Waffen-Grenadier-Division der SS (Galizische Nr.1) but rejected such a principle.

Division's names 
The division during its short history changed its name a number of times, being known as:
 SS Schützen Division "Galizien" or Galizien Division – from 30 July 1943 to August 1943 (during recruitment)
 SS Freiwilligen Division "Galizien" – from August 1943 to 27 July 1944 (during training)
 14. Waffen-Grenadier-Division der SS (Galizische Nr.1) – from August 1944 to the Winter of 1944
 14. Waffen-Grenadier-Division der SS (ukrainische Nr.1) – from the Winter of 1944 to Spring 1945
 1st Ukrainian Division of the Ukrainian National Army – from Spring 1945.

Formation 
 Waffen Grenadier Regiment der SS 29
 Waffen-Grenadier Regiment der SS 30
 Waffen-Grenadier Regiment der SS 31
 Waffen-Artillery Regiment der SS 14
 SS-Waffen-Füsilier-Battalion 14
 SS-Waffen-Panzerjäger Company 14
 SS-Volunteer-Flak Battalion 14
 Waffen Signals Battalion der SS 14
 SS-Radfahr-Battalion 14
 Waffen-Pionier-Battalion der SS 14
 SS-Versorgungs-Company 14
 SS-Division-Signals Troop 14
 SS Medical Battalion 14
 SS-Veterinary Company 14
 SS-Field post department 14
 SS-War Reporter platoon 14
 SS Feldgendarmerie troop 14

Legacy 

The 14th Waffen Grenadier Division of the SS (1st Galician) is today honored by many Ukrainian nationalists. Since 2010 every year on 28 April a march is held to celebrate the foundation of the division. In addition streets were named after the division in Ivano-Frankivsk (Ukrains`koi Dyvizii Street) and Ternopil (Soldiers Division "Galicia" Street).

In Canada 

The granite memorial Pam”iatnyk Slavy UPA (English: Monument to the Glory of the UPA) was inaugurated on 26 May 1988 in St. Volodymyr Ukrainian Cemetery in the Canadian city of Oakville. The emblem of the 14th Waffen Grenadier Division of the SS (1st Galician) was added to the memorial soon after. On 22 June 2020 the monument was vandalized when someone painted "Nazi war monument" on it.

On 17 July of that year, it was announced by the Halton Regional Police that this was being investigated as a hate crime before being walked back soon after.There is also a monument to the division in St. Michael's Cemetery in Edmonton. In 2021 it was vandalized with "nazi monument" painted on one side and "14th Waffen SS" on the other.

See also 
 List of Waffen-SS units
 Ranks and insignia of the Waffen-SS
 Waffen-SS foreign volunteers and conscripts
 :Category:Members of the Galizien division
 List of German divisions in World War II
 Chodaczków Wielki massacre
 Ukrainian Liberation Army

References

Notes

Footnotes

Bibliography
 Wolf-Dietrich Heike. The Ukrainian Division 'Galicia', 1943–45, A Memoir. (audiobook) Shevchenko Scientific Society. (1988)
  Jurij Kyryczuk, "" in "Polska-Ukraina" vol 6., Karta, Warszawa 2002, pp. 244–266
 Caballero Jurado, Carlos. Breaking the Chains: 14 Waffen-Grenadier-Division der SS and Other Ukrainian Volunteer Formations, Eastern Front, 1941–45. Halifax, West Yorkshire: Shelf Books, 1998 
 
 
 
 
 
 
 Melnyk, Michael James, The History of the Galician Division of the Waffen SS: On the Eastern Front: April 1943 to July 1944, Fonthill Media, 2016, 
 Melnyk, Michael James, The History of the Galician Division of the Waffen SS: Stalin's Nemesis, Fonthill Media, 2016.  
 
 
 Per Anders Rudling, They Defended Ukraine': The 14. Waffen-Grenadier-Division der SS (Galizische Nr. 1) Revisited, The Journal of Slavic Military Studies, 25:3, 329–368 online version
 
 
 The Ukrainian Division Halychyna by Dr. Roman Serbyn

14
Military history of Ukraine during World War II

Military units and formations established in 1943
Foreign volunteer units of the Waffen-SS
Infantry divisions of the Waffen-SS
Military units and formations disestablished in 1945
District of Galicia